Viola Steeds Cameron (nee White; 20 March 1917 — 25 July 2006) was a British field hockey and tennis player.

Born and raised in Wiltshire, White lived on the family farm in Zeals. Locally she captained the Wiltshire country team and was a six-time singles champion at Winchester.

White was a regular in the Wimbledon draw from 1947 to 1961, reaching three women's doubles quarter-finals with Mary Eyre. She made the singles fourth round at Wimbledon in 1952 and captained England that year against Wales.

As a field hockey player, White was good enough to go on a tour to South Africa with the national team in 1950. She scored four times in a tour match against an International Wanders team, for which she was singled out for praise in the Johannesburg Star newspaper for her control and footwork.

References

1917 births
2006 deaths
British female tennis players
English female tennis players
English female field hockey players
Tennis people from Wiltshire